In Greek mythology, the Cretan Bull was the bull Pasiphaë fell in love with, giving birth to the Minotaur.

Mythology

Background
Minos was king in Crete. In order to confirm his right to rule, rather than any of his brothers, he prayed Poseidon send him a snow-white bull as a sign. Poseidon sent Minos the bull, with the understanding that bull would be sacrificed to the god. Deciding that Poseidon's bull was too fine of a specimen to kill, Minos sent the bull to his herds and substituted another, inferior bull for sacrifice. Enraged, Poseidon had Aphrodite curse Pasiphaë, the wife of Minos, causing her to fall in love with the bull. She subsequently gave birth to the half-man, half-bull, Minotaur. Poseidon passed on his rage to the bull, causing him to lay waste to the land.

After consulting the oracle at Delphi, Minos had Daedalus construct the Labyrinth to hold the Minotaur.

The seventh labour of Heracles

Heracles was sent to capture the bull by Eurystheus as his seventh task. He sailed to Crete, whereupon Minos gave Heracles permission to take the bull away  as he had been wreaking havoc on Crete by uprooting crops and leveling orchard walls. Heracles captured the bull, and then shipped him to Eurystheus in Tiryns. The bull later broke loose and wandered into Marathon, becoming known as the "Marathonian Bull". Eurystheus then sent Heracles to bring back the man-eating Mares of Diomedes (the next task).

Capture by Theseus
Androgeus, a son of Minos and Pasiphaë, competed in the games held by Aegeus, King of Athens. He won all the games, but the bull, which broke free from his pen, rampaged through the city and trampled Androgeus. Devastated, Minos went to war with Athens and won. As punishment, the Athenians had to send several youths every 9 years to be devoured by the Minotaur.

Theseus set to try to capture the bull. On the way to Marathon, Theseus sought shelter from a storm in the shack owned by an old lady named Hecale. She swore to make a sacrifice to Zeus if Theseus was successful in capturing the bull. Theseus did capture the bull, but when he returned to Hecale's hut, she was dead. Theseus built a deme in her honour. He then dragged the bull to Athens where he sacrificed him to Athena and/or Apollo. Theseus then went to Crete where he killed the Minotaur with the help of Minos' daughter Ariadne.

Origin
According to Jeremy McInerney, the iconography of the bull permeates Minoan culture.  The cult of the bull was also prominent in southwestern Anatolia. Bernard Clive Dietrich notes that the most important animal in the Neolithic shrines at Çatalhöyük was the bull. The bull was a chthonic animal associated with fertility and vegetation. It figured in cave cults connected with rites for the dead.

The palace at Knossos displays a number of murals depicting young men and women vaulting over a bull. While scholars are divided as to whether or not this reflects an actual practice, Barry B. Powell suggests it may have contributed to the story of the young Athenians sent to the Minotaur. McInerney observes that the story of Pasiphaë and the Cretan Bull was not written until after Crete had come under Greek control. Emma Stafford notes that the story of the Cretan Bull does not appear before the Hellenistic period and suggests the connection between Crete and Athens is the result of the development of the myth of the Theseus cycle in late sixth century Athens.

Classical Literature Sources 
Chronological listing of classical literature sources for the Cretan and Marathonian Bull:

The Cretan Bull 
 Euripides, Hippolytus 337 ff (trans. Coleridge) (Greek tragedy C5th BC)
 Diodorus Siculus, Library of History 4. 13. 4 (trans. Oldfather) (Greek history C1st BC)
 Diodorus Siculus, Library of History 4. 77. 1
 Virgil, Aeneid 6. 24 ff (trans. Hamilton Bryce) (Roman epic poetry C1st BC)
 Virgil, Eclogue 6, 43ff (trans. Hamilton Bryce) (Roman bucolic poetry C1st BC)
 Propertius, Elegies 2. 32 (trans. Goold) (Roman elegy C1st BC)
 Propertius, Elegies 3. 19
 Propertius, Elegies 4. 7
 Lucretius, Of the Nature of Things 5. Proem 1 (trans. Leonard) (Roman philosophy C1st BC)
 Ovid, Metamorphoses 8. 130 ff (trans. Miller) (Roman epic poetry C1st BC to C1st AD)
 Ovid, Metamorphoses 8. 136 ff
 Ovid, Metamorphoses 8. 155 ff
 Ovid, Metamorphoses 9. 186 ff
 Ovid, Metamorphoses 9. 735 ff
 Ovid, Fasti 3. 500 ff (trans. Miller)
 Ovid, Heroides 4. 56 ff (trans. Miller)
 Ovid, Heroides 4. 165 ff
 Bacchylides papyrus, Fragment 26 (Greek Lyric trans. Campbell Vol. 4) (Greek poetry C1st AD)
 Philippus of Thessalonica, The Twelve Labors of Hercules (The Greek Classics ed. Miller Vol 3 1909 p. 397) (Greek epigrams C1st AD)
 Seneca, Hippolytus 113 ff (trans. Miller) (Roman tragedy C1st AD)
 Seneca, Hippolytus 1163 ff
 Seneca, Hercules Furens 230 ff (trans. Miller) (Roman tragedy C1st AD)
 Seneca, Agamemnon 833 ff (trans. Miller) (Roman tragedy C1st AD)
 Valerius Flaccus, Argonautica 1. 34ff (trans. Blomfield) (Roman epic poetry C1st AD)
 Pseudo-Apollodorus, The Library 2. 5. 7 (trans. Frazer) (Greek mythography C2nd AD)
 Pseudo-Apollodorus, The Library 3. 1. 3
 Pausanias, Description of Greece 1. 27. 9 (trans. Jones) (Greek travelogue C2nd AD)
 Pseudo-Hyginus, Fabulae 30 (trans. Grant) (Roman mythography C2nd AD)
 Pseudo-Hyginus, Fabulae 38
 Pseudo-Hyginus, Fabulae 40
 Philostratus the Elder, Imagines 1. 16 (trans. Fairbanks) (Greek rhetoric C3rd AD)
 Quintus Smyrnaeus, Fall of Troy 6. 236 ff (trans. Way) (Greek epic poetry C4th AD)
 Nonnos, Dionysiaca 25. 242 ff (trans. Rouse) (Greek epic poetry C5th AD)
 Nonnos, Dionysiaca 45, 261
 Nonnos, Dionysiaca 47. 395 ff
 Suidas, s.v. En panti muthoi kai to Daidalou musos (trans. Suda On Line) (Greco-Byzantine Lexicon C10th AD)
 Tzetzes, Chiliades or Book of Histories 1. 473 ff (trans. Untila et al.) (Greco-Byzantine history C12 AD)
 Tzetzes, Chiliades or Book of Histories 2. 293 ff

The Marathonian Bull 
 Diodorus Siculus, Library of History 4. 59. 6 (trans. Oldfather) (Greek history C1st BC)
 Strabo, Geography 9. 1. 22 (trans. Jones) (Greek geography C1st BC to C1st AD)
 Ovid, Metamorphoses 7. 433 ff (trans. Frazer) (Roman epic poetry C1st BC to C1st AD)
 Statius, Thebaid 12. 672 ff (trans. Mozley) (Roman epic poetry C1st AD)
 Plutarch, Life of Theseus 14. 1 ff (trans. Perrin) (Greek history C1st to C2nd AD)
 Pseudo-Apollodorus, The Library 2. 5. 7 (trans. Frazer) (Greek mythography C2nd AD)
 Pseudo-Apollodorus, The Library 3. 15. 7
 Pseudo-Apollodorus, The Library E1. 5 ff
 Pausanias, Description of Greece 1. 27. 9 (trans. Jones) (Greek travelogue C2nd AD)
 Pseudo-Hyginus, Fabulae 38 (trans. Grant) (Roman mythography C2nd AD)
 Tzetzes, Chiliades or Book of Histories 298 ff (trans. Untila et al.) (Greco-Byzantinian history C12 AD)

In popular culture 
 Taurus is one of the oldest observed constellations, and has been variously connected with the abduction of Europa, the seduction of Io, and the Cretan Bull. The Taurid meteor shower is named after the radiant point in the constellation Taurus, from where they are seen to come. Occurring in late October and early November, they are sometimes called "Halloween fireballs".
 Charles Bertram Lewis sees the episode of the Monstrous Herdsman in Chrétien de Troyes' Yvain, the Knight of the Lion, essentially a re-telling of the story of "Theseus and the Minotaur". 
 Mary Renault's historical novel, The Bull from the Sea, recounts the story of Theseus after he returns from Crete.

 In the 2005 Hercules miniseries, the bull is adapted out and revealed to actually be Antaeus roving around on horse back and wearing a horned helmet.

 In the video game Assassin's Creed Odyssey, there is a side quest where the player fights the bull.

See also 
 Bull (mythology)
 Donn Cuailnge, the Brown Bull of Cooley
 Kao (bull)
 Minotaur

References

External links 
 

Labours of Hercules
Labours of Theseus
Mythological bulls
Mythological bovines
Monsters in Greek mythology
Deeds of Poseidon
History of Crete
Cattle in art
Sacred bulls